Malesherbia angustisecta is an endangered member of Malesherbia (Passifloraceae). It is colloquially called clavelina. The first published description of the species dates to 1922 and Hermann Harms is accredited with its discovery. It is native to arid and semiarid deserts of Peru. It is a pale green woody shrub and has pale pink / white flowers.

Malesherbia angustisecta is currently considered endangered due to its restricted distribution.

References 

Plants described in 1922
Flora of Peru
Taxa named by Hermann Harms
angustisecta